Luca Nardi was the defending champion but chose not to defend his title.

Otto Virtanen won the title after defeating Cem İlkel 6–4, 7–6(7–5) in the final.

Seeds

Draw

Finals

Top half

Bottom half

References

External links
Main draw
Qualifying draw

Challenger Città di Lugano - 1